SJ Chiro is an American screenwriter and film director. She has made her feature film directing debut with Lane 1974 in 2017 and later directed East of the Mountains in 2021.

Career
SJ Chiro was born and raised in Seattle, Washington She graduated in theater and French literature from the Bennington College.

Chiro started her career with short films Little Red Riding Hood (2006), Third Days Child (2008), A Water Tale (2009), The Epiphany (2011), and Howard from Ohio (2011).

Chiro adapted "The Hypocrisy of Disco: A Memoir" by Clane Hayward as Lane 1974, her award-winning and debut feature film. The film was produced by Chiro, and Jennessa West, and its cast include Sophia Mitri Schloss, Katherine Moennig, Sara Coates, Jasmin Savoy Brown and Linas Phillips. It premiered at the 2017 SXSW, received positive reviews and was distributed worldwide by The Orchard. Chiro used her own childhood experiences and spent nine years in making the 1970s-Northern California-set film.

Chiro directed East of the Mountains, starring Tom Skerritt. The film was released in 2021.

Filmography

Awards
2017 New American Cinema Competition at the Seattle International Film Festival: Lane 1974
2017 Golden Space Needle Award nomination at the Seattle International Film Festival: Lane 1974
2017 SXSW Gamechanger Award nomination at the SXSW Film Festival: Lane 1974
2021 Jury Prize at the Yale in Hollywood Fest: Lane 1974

References

External links

Year of birth missing (living people)
Living people
American women film directors
American women screenwriters
Place of birth missing (living people)
21st-century American women